Gerald Hans Isaac (born 20 August 1971) is a Malaysian actor, producer, and director.

On 10 April 2019, he was appointed as the Chairman of the National Film Development Corporation Malaysia (FINAS). He resigned as the chairman of the body after a year.

In December 2021, Hans announced on his Instagram post that he had been retired from his acting career after more than two decades.

Background
Hans Isaac was born on 20 August 1971 in the Sultanah Aminah General Hospital in Johor Bahru to Carmina Anciano Isaac, and Edward Anthony Gerald Isaac, a naval officer.

The Isaac family were in Johore for eight years before transferring to the KD Sri Rejang base in Sibu, Sarawak. They eventually settled in Kuala Lumpur when Hans was around eight to nine years old as his father was appointed as an aide for the Yang Di-Pertuan Agong at the National Palace in Jalan Istana there until his retirement. It was also in the city that he received his early education at the St. John's Institution. He holds a bachelor's degree in Business Administration from the Singapore Institute of Commerce and a bachelor's degree in Hotel Management from Stamford College, Malaysia.

Personal life
In February 2017, he announced his engagement to Aileen Gabriella Robinson, who won the title of Miss Tourism International of 2011. On 30 October 2017, however, he announced that the marriage will not take place.

He is also a member of the People's Justice Party (PKR) since joining it in 2020.

Filmography

Film

Television series

Telemovie

Television show

Other appearances

Honours
  :
  Knight Companion of the Order of the Crown of Pahang (DIMP) - Dato' (2016)

References

External links
 Official website
 

1971 births
Living people
People from Johor Bahru
Malaysian people of German descent
Malaysian people of Filipino descent
Malaysian people of Indian descent
Malaysian people of Spanish descent
Malaysian people of Portuguese descent
Malaysian people of Kristang descent
Kristang people
Malaysian television presenters
Malaysian male actors
Malaysian male models
Malaysian socialites
Malaysian actor-politicians
People's Justice Party (Malaysia) politicians
21st-century Malaysian people